This page summarises the Australia national soccer team fixtures and results in 2000.

Record

Match results

Friendlies

Oceania Nations Cup

Goal scorers

References

 Ozfootball.net Australian National Team Results 2000

2000
2000 in Australian soccer
2000 national football team results